Jinwen University of Science and Technology (Chinese: 景文科大站; Pinyin: Jǐngwén kēdà zhàn) is a light rail station of the Ankeng light rail, operated by the New Taipei Metro, in Xindian, New Taipei, Taiwan.

Station overview
The station is an at-grade station with 2 side platforms. It is located on Section 1, Anyi Road, near Anzhong Road.

Station layout

Around the station
 Jinwen University of Science and Technology
 Kang Chiao International School Qingshan Campus
 Ankang Forest Park

Bus connections
Buses 897 and G10 stop at this station.

History
Construction of the station started on November 7, 2014 and was completed in 2022. The station opened on February 10, 2023.

See also
 Ankeng light rail
 New Taipei Metro
 Rail transport in Taiwan

References

External links
 New Taipei Metro Corporation
 New Taipei City Department of Rapid Transit

 Railway stations in Taiwan